David Norman Currie (born 27 November 1962) is an English former footballer who played as a striker for Middlesbrough, Darlington, Barnsley, Nottingham Forest, Oldham Athletic, Rotherham United, Huddersfield Town, Carlisle United and Scarborough.

He joined Barnsley in 1988 and played 80 league games for them, scoring 30 goals. Currie joined Nottingham Forest in January 1990, and made his debut for them on 3 February, although in August 1990 he moved again to join Oldham after falling fowl of Brian Clough

Honours
Individual
PFA Team of the Year: 1988–89 Second Division

References

1962 births
Living people
Footballers from Stockton-on-Tees
Footballers from County Durham
English footballers
Association football forwards
Middlesbrough F.C. players
Darlington F.C. players
Nottingham Forest F.C. players
Oldham Athletic A.F.C. players
Barnsley F.C. players
Rotherham United F.C. players
Huddersfield Town A.F.C. players
Carlisle United F.C. players
Scarborough F.C. players
Whitby Town F.C. players
English Football League players